Mirza Mešić (born 28 June 1980) is a Bosnian-Herzegovinian former professional footballer who played as a forward.

Career
Mešić was born in Tuzla. He played for Sloboda Tuzla, French Nantes and Besançon, FK Željezničar, Croatian Hajduk Split, NK Žepče, NK Posušje, FK Sarajevo, Slovenian Rudar Velenje and Bulgarian side PFC Lokomotiv Sofia.

References

1980 births
Living people
Sportspeople from Tuzla
Association football forwards
Bosnia and Herzegovina footballers
FK Sloboda Tuzla players
FC Nantes players
FK Sarajevo players
FK Željezničar Sarajevo players
Racing Besançon players
HNK Hajduk Split players
NK Žepče players
HŠK Posušje players
NK Rudar Velenje players
FC Lokomotiv 1929 Sofia players
NK Vinogradar players
FK Radnički Lukavac players
Premier League of Bosnia and Herzegovina players
Ligue 1 players
Ligue 2 players
Croatian Football League players
Slovenian PrvaLiga players
First Professional Football League (Bulgaria) players
First Football League (Croatia) players
First League of the Federation of Bosnia and Herzegovina players
Bosnia and Herzegovina expatriate footballers
Expatriate footballers in France
Bosnia and Herzegovina expatriate sportspeople in France
Expatriate footballers in Croatia
Bosnia and Herzegovina expatriate sportspeople in Croatia
Expatriate footballers in Slovenia
Bosnia and Herzegovina expatriate sportspeople in Slovenia
Expatriate footballers in Bulgaria
Bosnia and Herzegovina expatriate sportspeople in Bulgaria